Aurel Percă (born August 15, 1951) is a Romanian prelate of the Catholic Church who was named Archbishop of Bucharest on 21 November 2019. He served as auxiliary bishop of Iași from 1999 to 2019.

Biography
Born in Săbăoani, Neamț County, he attended high school there and completed his studies at the Roman Catholic Theological Institute of Iași in 1969. He was ordained a priest in 1979 and became assistant priest at a parish in Bacău. He earned degrees in Eastern theology from the Pontifical Oriental Institute and in moral theology from the Alphonsian Academy.

In 1985, he became a professor of moral theology and patristics at the Iaşi seminary and was its rector from 1989 to 1994. In 1994 he was named vicar general of the archdiocese while continuing to teach. In 1999 Pope John Paul II named him auxiliary bishop of Iași. He received his episcopal consecration as titular bishop of Mauriana.

Pope Francis named him Archbishop of Bucharest on 21 November 2019.

References

1951 births
Living people
People from Săbăoani
21st-century Roman Catholic archbishops in Romania
21st-century Roman Catholic titular bishops
Pontifical Oriental Institute alumni